Rawendis or Rwendi, a Persian sect that took its name from a town (Rawend) near Isfahan. Its origin is unknown, but they held Shi'ite doctrines. Under the year 158 (AD 775) Tabari says that a man of the Rwendis, called al-Ablaq (because he was leprous), asserted that the spirit that was in Jesus was in Ali, then in the imams one after the other to Muhammad "al-Imām" and then finally to Ibrahim "al-Imām" ibn Muhammad; and that thus these were gods. Asad ibn Abdallah al-Qasri, then governor of Khorasan, put many of them to death. Under the year 135 (AD 752–3) the historian again mentions a rising of the Rwendis of Talaqan, and its suppression. Under 141 (AD 758–9) he gives a fuller account of them. They believed in metempsychosis, or the transmigration of souls, and asserted that the spirit of Adam was in Othman ibn Nahik; that the Lord who fed them and gave them drink was Abu Ja'far Abdallah ibn Muhammad Al-Mansur, and that al-Haitham ibn Muawiya was Gabriel. Accordingly they came to the palace of Mansur in Hashimiyya and began to hail him as lord. Mansur, however, secured their chiefs and threw them into prison. By means of a mock funeral they succeeded in reaching the prison and delivering their leaders. They then turned in wrath against Mansur and almost succeeded in capturing him, but were defeated and slain by al-Haitham.

References

Shia Islamic branches